Retrobright refers to H2O2 (hydrogen peroxide) based processes used to remove yellowing from ABS plastics. The usage has also expanded to other retro restoration applications, such as classic and collectible sneaker restoration, where it is referred to by collectors as "sole sauce".

Yellowing in ABS plastic occurs when it is exposed to UV light or excessive heat, which causes photo-oxidation of polymers that breaks polymer chains and causes the plastic to yellow and become brittle. 

One method of reversing the yellowed discoloration coined the term (stylized as retr0bright or Retrobrite) was first discovered in 2007 in a German retrocomputing forum, before spreading to an English blog where it was further detailed. The process has been continually refined since.

The long-term effectiveness of these techniques is questioned. Some have discovered the yellowing reappears, and there are concerns that the process weakens and only bleaches the already damaged plastic.

Alternatives 
Certain beauty salon products that are primarily composed of hydrogen peroxide can also be used as an alternative to retrobright, as it has been discovered to be almost identical in effect, and already viscous so that it can be applied less wastefully to yellowed plastics (especially large devices such as computer panels or monitors). While this eliminates the difficulty of having to put together a batch directly from the instructions, one must be careful to apply the cream and wrap consistently and evenly to avoid streaks in the final product.

Sodium percarbonate may also be used by dissolving it in water and following the usual steps for hydrogen peroxide, as it is sodium carbonate and hydrogen peroxide in a crystalline form.

Ozone gas can also be used for retrobrighting, as long as an ozone generator, a suitable container of sufficient size and a source of UV are available, but can take longer than other methods.

Retrobright 
Retrobright consists of hydrogen peroxide, a small amount of the "active oxygen" laundry booster TAED as a catalyst, and a source of UV.

The optimum mixture and conditions for reversing yellowing of plastics:

 A hydrogen peroxide solution (oxigenated water).

 A source of ultraviolet light, from sunlight or a UV lamp.

Xanthan gum or arrowroot can be added to the mixture, creating an easier-to-apply gel. In addition to homemade gel mixtures, hydrogen peroxide-based hair bleaching creams available at beauty supply stores can also be used as a ready-made mix.

References 

Cleaning products
Plastics
Hacker culture